1,4-Dichloro-2-nitrobenzene is an organic compound with the formula C6H3Cl2NO2. One of several isomers of dichloronitrobenzene, it is a yellow solid that is insoluble in water.  It is produced by nitration of 1,4-dichlorobenzene.  It is a precursor to many derivatives of commercial interest. Hydrogenation gives 1,4-dichloroaniline.  Nucleophiles displace the chloride adjacent to the nitro group: ammonia gives the aniline derivative, aqueous base gives the phenol derivative, and methoxide gives the anisole derivative.  These compounds are respectively 4-chloro-2-nitroaniline, 4-chloro-2-nitrophenol, and 4-chloro-2-nitroanisole.

References

Nitrobenzenes
Chlorobenzenes